Hitler Kalyana is a 2021 Indian Kannada television soap opera that telecasts on ZEE5 even before TV telecast. This series is produced by Dileep Raj. It was premiered on 9 August 2020 airing from Monday to Friday on Zee Kannada. The show is a remake of Hindi serial Guddan Tumse Na Ho Payega, which airs on Zee TV. The series stars Dileep Raj, Malaika Vasupal as the main leads. Harsha CM Gowda to play CCB officer in Hitler Kalyana

Cast 
 Dileep Raj as Abhiram Jayshankar aka AJ
 Malaika Vasupal as Leela Abhiram Jayashankar
 Nandini Murthy as Durga (AJ's daughter-in-law)
 Neha Patil as Lakshmi (AJ's daughter-in-law)
 Padmini as Saraswati or Saru (AJ's daughter-in-law)
 Vidya Murthy as Sarojini
 Vinay Kashyap as Prem 
 Raki Gowda as Pramod
 Ravi Bhat as Chandrashekhar
 Abhinaya as Kousalya
 Deepika Aradhya as Revathi or Chukki
 Shashank as Dev (AJ's brother-in-law)
 Comedy Khiladigalu Rakesh as Vishwaroop
 Deepa Katte as Shwetha

Production
Actor Dileep Raj, who is making a come back in small screen is the lead actor in the serial. He was the lead actor in serials Rathasapthami Purushottama. Actress Malaika T Vasupal is cast in the lead female role of Leela, who is making her debut through this serial.

Adaptations

Reception
The show was the most watched Kannada show in its debut week.

References

External links
Hitler Kalyana at ZEE5

Zee Kannada original programming
Kannada-language television shows
Television shows set in Karnataka
Indian television soap operas
Serial drama television series
2021 Indian television series debuts